Bear Creek is a stream in Johnson County in the U.S. state of Missouri. It is a tributary of the Blackwater River.

Bear Creek was named for the fact the area was a hunting ground for bears by pioneer citizens.

See also
List of rivers of Missouri

References

Rivers of Johnson County, Missouri
Rivers of Missouri